St. Albert's Church is a Roman Catholic church in Riga, the capital of Latvia. The church is situated at the address 38 Liepāja Street. It is the biggest catholic church in Latvia it can host around 2500 people.

History 
As the population of Riga in the nineteenth century grew rapidly, on the threshold of the upcoming city's 700th anniversary,  in 1899., the parish priest prelate Francis Afanasovičs proposed the construction of a new Catholic church in Pārdaugava, the left side of Daugava river.

On May 22, 1899, the Riga City Council donated a 1,600 square meters plot of land in Kurzemes Street, for the construction of a Catholic church, a school and a parish house.

A year later, in 1900, on July 14, architect and dean of the Faculty of Architecture of Riga Polytechnic Institute, prof. Johan Koch presented to the Building Committee a project for the two towers French Baroque style church. On September 2, of the same year, the proposed project was approved.

Just two months later, on November 10, 1901, the foundation stone of the new church was consecrated by parish priest prelate Francis Afanasovičs.

Only two years later, November 29, 1903, the parish priest prelate Francis Afanasovičs consecrated the new church dedicated to St. Albert the Great, built under supervision of the architect Wilhelm Bockslaff who made some minor changes to the original project. The church is built as a three nave church 50 m long and 24 m wide, which makes of it the largest Catholic church in Latvia.

In 1911, when Riga's prelature has divided into three parishes, reverend Dominiks Taujenis became the first parish priest of the St. Albert 's parish. At the end of the year of 1914. the number of parish faithfuls reached 20 000. During the WW I, reverend Felikss Poško was active in the parish. From the 1919. reverend Peteris Silovičs, the well-known author of Catholic books and an adviser to the archdiocese from 1925., became the parish priest.

The convent house has its own history. The house belonged to reverend Peteris Silovičs, and it was originally built in Jūrkalne, a small town by the sea, some 200 km far away from Riga. When reverend Peteris Silovičs moved to Riga, he got the house dismantled and transported to Riga, by the sea way. It was re-installed within a church yard.  Finally, to accommodate the needs of the time, in 1936., a stone building was built instead. The doors and  windows of this new stone house were obtained from a certain ruined summer house, in Jurmala. "So the old and the new convent houses have seen the sea.", was an extraordinary remark of the Latvian Catholic historian, reverend Jānis Svilāns!

In June 1933., Auxiliary Bishop of Riga, Jāzeps Rancāns, on behalf of Metropolitan Archbishop of Riga, Antonijus Springovičs, the parish of Saint Albert entrusted to the Franciscan Order of Friars Minor Capuchin.

The great and final reparation of the church took place in 1935, undertaken by Franciscans themselves.

The Franciscans ministered the parish until October 19, 1949. when the Franciscan convent was closed and the parish was entrusted back to diocesan priests.

The most extensive repairs of the interior took place in 1968.-1969., while the facade was repaired and painted in 1988.

After the restoration of Latvia's independence, the parish of Saint Albert was, in June, 1991. once again, entrusted to the same Franciscan Order.

The new, great refreshment of the church started in 2016., and it is still ongoing in 2021. This refreshment of the church  is very comprehensive, including the construction works and complete interior and exterior: painting and restoration of the church. It is expected to be finished by 2024.

Altars 
Beside the main altar, the church has four more altars. Two of them are at the each side of the main altar. The other two altars are on the both sides of the church, in the middle, each of them in a small chapel rooms within the side naves of the church. While one altar is placed at the right hand of the main entrance of the church.

The main altar 

The main altar of a church is dedicated to the Sacred Heart Of Jesus. At the central position of the altar, above the tabernacle, is a rather large statue showing Jesus offering his Sacred Heart. On both sides are niches with the statues. On the right side is the typical statue of saint Rocco as a pilgrim, with staff in his hand and a dog next to his leg. On the right side is a typical statue of Saint Anthony of Padua, holding a Baby Jesus and a lily. High above, dominating the altar is a painting of Jesus on the cross in Golgotha. The background of the painting, behind the back of Jesus, is painted dark sky, suggesting the moment when Jesus gave his last breath. 

The main altar is placed in a round shape niche room. Very high, on the both side walls are two wall niches. On the left side, within a wall niche, is a statue showing Saint Peter with a key, while within the right side wall niche is the statue of Saint Paul with a sword.

The Immaculate Heart of Mary altar 

The altar dedicated to the Immaculate Heart of Mary is on the right side of the main altar. On the altar is a great statue of the Holy Mary, Queen of heaven and earth, offering her heart, dressed in a sky blue color dress, with a  crown on her head. Above the statues of Holy Mary is a painting of Saint Therese of Lisieux also known as Saint Therese of the Child Jesus and the Holy Face.

The Saint Albert of Riga altar 
The altar is decorated with an altar size painting of the saint, showing Saint Albert of Riga, dressed in a liturgical garments wearing a miter and bearing a pastoral staff.

The Holy Family altar 
Within a right side niche room is placed the Holy Family altar decorated with the painting showing a Holy Family. Jesus is shown as a boy of possible age of twelve years, which suggest the painter's idea of describing the moment when Jesus was found in the Temple by Mary and Joseph.

The Saint Francis of Assisi altar 
Within a left side niche room is placed altar decorated with the painting showing a vision of Saint Francis of Assisi. The vision is showing Jesus and Holy Mary in the front of surprised Francis who is dressed in a brown friar habit.

The Holy Mary altar 

The altar of Holy Mary is placed within a small chapel, at the right side of the main entrance of the church. The altar is decorated with the statue of Holy Mary with baby Jesus in her right hand. The statue symbolizes the artist's poetic description of a "Woman of the Apocalypse": "A great sign appeared in the sky, a woman clothed with the sun, with the moon under her feet, and on her head a crown of twelve stars. She was with child and wailed aloud in pain as she labored to give birth." (Revelation 12: 1-2). 

The statue shows Holy Mary with a sad expression on her face. She is in tears, in pain. The sky blue long wrap dress, painted with the stars, is on her shoulders all the way down to her feet. She is standing with the moon globe under her feet, a twelve stars gloriole around her head. Holding baby Jesus in her right hand. With the arms widespread, baby Jesus is looking at his mother, an expression of consolation is on his face.

Pipe organ 
The 30 stops pipe organ of the church was built in 1912., by Emil Martin & Co., Opus 316. Emil Martin was the son of, also very known pipe organ builder August Martin, who was very active organ builder in the Baltic. Emil has, most probably inherited the company from his father. To this conclusion brings the fact that on the nameplate of the organ is visible the year 1838. as the year of the establishment of the company.

References

Sources 
 Rīgas Svētā Alberta draudze, https://albertadraudze.lv/

 Jānis Svilāns; Latvijas Romas-katoļu Baznīcas un kapelas 1975., Rīgas Metropolijas kūrija, 1995. Riga

External links 
 

Roman Catholic churches in Riga
Roman Catholic churches in Latvia